Choi Dong-hoon (born February 24, 1971) is a South Korean film director and screenwriter. He ranks as one of the most consistently successful directors working in contemporary Korean cinema, with all five of his films becoming commercial hits -- The Big Swindle attracted 2.12 million viewers, Tazza: The High Rollers at 6.84 million, Jeon Woo-chi: The Taoist Wizard at 6.13 million, The Thieves at 12.9 million, and Assassination at 12.7 million.

Career
After graduating from the prestigious Korean Academy of Film Arts, Choi Dong-hoon first worked as an assistant director on Im Sang-soo's Tears (he subsequently appeared in acting cameos in several of Im's films).

After working on the screenplay for two years, Choi made his feature film directorial debut in 2004 with The Big Swindle and single-handedly re-imagined the heist and crime thriller genre into something uniquely Korean. His follow-up Tazza: The High Rollers, a gambling flick adapted from Huh Young-man and Kim Se-yeong's manhwa, was the second highest grossing Korean film of 2006, and producer/Sidus FNH CEO Cha Seung-jae praised Choi as "a genius storyteller for his spectacular ability to develop elaborate stories." 2009's Jeon Woo-chi: The Taoist Wizard was lauded as the first Korean fantasy/superhero blockbuster movie, earning Choi a reputation as an artistically innovative and commercially successful writer-director.

He returned to the heist genre in 2012 with the star-studded crime caper The Thieves, which attracted almost 13 million viewers in 70 days to become the second all-time highest grossing movie in Korean film history. Tazza and Thieves leading lady Kim Hye-soo described him as "a genius who also works extremely hard. I think he knows who he is, the exact kind of films that he wants to make, and how to make them."

Choi made his first period film with 2015's Assassination, about freedom fighters during Japan's colonial rule, and it was once again a box office hit, crossing the 10 million admissions milestone on the 70th anniversary of South Korean independence.

In 2017, Choi began production on his next film Wiretap, a remake of the 2009 Hong Kong film Overheard. However, production was halted so Kim Woo Bin could undergo treatment for cancer. At the end of 2019, the director was then reported to be working on a two-part science fiction film. The first part titled Alienoid which depicts a story unfolding as the door of time open between late Goryeo and the present day, when aliens appear, was released in July 2022.

Filmography

As director
A Short Trip (short film, director; 2000)
The Big Swindle (director, screenwriter; 2004)
Tazza: The High Rollers (director, screenwriter; 2006)
Jeon Woo-chi: The Taoist Wizard (director, screenwriter; 2009)
The Thieves (director, screenwriter; 2012)
Assassination (director, screenwriter, producer; 2015)
Alienoid (director, screenwriter, producer; 2022)
Wiretap (director, screenwriter; TBA)

Other
Tears (assistant director, cameo; 2000)
A Good Lawyer's Wife (cameo; 2003)
Boy Goes to Heaven (screenwriter; 2005)
The President's Last Bang (cameo; 2005)
The Restless (screenwriter; 2006)

Awards
2004 3rd Korean Film Awards: Best New Director (The Big Swindle)
2004 3rd Korean Film Awards: Best Screenplay (The Big Swindle)
2004 25th Blue Dragon Film Awards: Best New Director (The Big Swindle)
2004 25th Blue Dragon Film Awards: Best Screenplay (The Big Swindle)
2004 7th Director's Cut Awards: Best New Director (The Big Swindle)
2004 24th Korean Association of Film Critics Awards: Best New Director (The Big Swindle)
2004 41st Grand Bell Awards: Best New Director (The Big Swindle)
2004 41st Grand Bell Awards: Best Screenplay (The Big Swindle)
2005 SBS Gayo Daejeon: Music Video of the Year
2007 6th Korean Film Awards: Best Screenplay (Tazza: The High Rollers)
2007 8th Busan Film Critics Awards: Best Screenplay (Tazza: The High Rollers)
2007 43rd Baeksang Arts Awards: Best Director (Tazza: The High Rollers)
2016: 21st Chunsa Film Art Awards: Best Director (Assassination)

See also
List of Korean film directors
Cinema of Korea

References

External links
 
 
 

South Korean film directors
South Korean screenwriters
Sogang University alumni
People from Jeonju
1971 births
Living people
Best Director Paeksang Arts Award (film) winners